The Philberds was a preparatory school based in a house in Holyport, near Maidenhead, Berkshire, on the site of one which Charles II had given to Nell Gwyn. The name derives from a family which owned land in the area in mediaeval times.

History
The school was founded in 1862 by the Reverend Frederick W.S. Price, who had previously founded a school at Tarvin in Cheshire which he had moved to Mostyn House in 1855.  The initial school fee was 80  guineas per annum.  

In 1885, the Revd. Price retired, leaving the school in the charge of his son Edward.

The school survived until the start of World War I.  During the war, the manor building was used as an internment camp for German prisoners of war, and in 1919 was demolished.

Old Philberdians F.C.

The Rev. Price founded an association football club, the Old Philberdians, for the old boys and masters of the school, for which he regularly played as captain; the first such recorded match being a 0–0 draw in a 12-a-side match against Maidenhead in April 1875. By 1877–78 the Old Philberdians were playing regularly against teams in the Berkshire area,  and the club was strong enough to beat the established teams of  Marlow and the Remnants.

In 1879–80, the club reached the final of the Berkshire & Buckinghamshire Senior Cup, having beaten Maidenhead away 7–0 en route. Following two draws with the Swifts (in Maidenhead and Reading), the clubs agreed to share the trophy.

The club was one of the first fifteen members of the Berkshire and Buckinghamshire Football Association and in 1880–81 entered the FA Cup for the only time.  The club withdrew when drawn away to Pilgrims; three of the club’s key players (the Wild brothers and Arnott) played instead for the Swifts.

Following that season, the club did not play competitively on either the local or national stage. Old Philberdians continued until at least 1889, with annual matches against Guy’s Hospital.

Notable individuals associated with the school
Pupils:
 John Challen, cricketer for Somerset and football international for Wales (played at least two games for the Old Philberdians in 1877) 
 Major Alexis Charles Doxat VC
 William Pasteur, discoverer of atelectasis
 Vice-Admiral Cecil Vivian Usborne, Director of Naval Intelligence

Teachers:
 Charles Henry Major, chief justice of British Guiana (schoolmaster and goalkeeper for the Old Philberdians)
 Graham Wallas, political scientist (Latin teacher)

References

Defunct football clubs in England
Defunct schools in England
Association football clubs established in the 19th century
Defunct football clubs in Berkshire